Grovely Castle is the site of an Iron Age univallate hill fort in the parish of Steeple Langford, in Wiltshire. Excavations have uncovered the remains of five human skeletons within the ramparts. Entrances are in the south-west and north-east corners of the hillfort. There is also a later bank and ditch which runs through the hill-fort from south-west to north-east, and is probably part of an extensive surrounding Celtic field system.

Location 
The site has a summit of  AOD. Nearby to the east lies the Iron Age site of Ebsbury, and to the south, the largest forest in Wiltshire, Grovely Wood.

See also 
 List of places in Wiltshire
 List of hill forts in England
 List of hill forts in Scotland
 List of hill forts in Wales

References 

Iron Age sites in England
Buildings and structures in Wiltshire
Hill forts in Wiltshire
Archaeological sites in Wiltshire
Scheduled monuments in Wiltshire